Kye Francis Rowles (born 24 June 1998) is an Australian professional footballer who plays as a central defender for Heart of Midlothian. Rowles began his professional career with Brisbane Roar in 2016 before moving to Central Coast Mariners in 2017. He has represented Australia at under-17 level, including at the 2015 FIFA U-17 World Cup, under-23 level at the Tokyo Olympics and at senior level at the 2022 FIFA World Cup.

Club career

Brisbane Roar
In May 2016, Rowles signed his first professional contract with Brisbane Roar on a two-year deal along with fellow young defender Connor O'Toole. Rowles made his first competitive start for the Roar in a loss to Ulsan Hyundai in the AFC Champions League on 28 February 2017.

Central Coast Mariners
Rowles moved to Central Coast Mariners on a one-year contract in June 2017. He made his Mariners' A-League debut on 18 November 2017, following an injury to Josh Rose, in a loss to Adelaide United.

Rowles played for the Mariners in the 2021 FFA Cup Final, which the Mariners lost 2-1. Rowles was jointly awarded the Mark Viduka Medal along with Jake Brimmer, becoming the first player to win the medal while playing for the losing team. He is also the only person to consecutively win the Mariners Medal.

Heart of Midlothian 
On 9 June 2022, Rowles joined Scottish Premiership side Heart of Midlothian for an undisclosed fee and signed a three-year deal. On 16 January 2023, following a successful World Cup with Australia, Rowles signed a five-year contract extension to 2028.

International career
Rowles was selected in the Australian under-17 team for the 2015 FIFA U-17 World Cup.

In November 2020, Rowles was called up to the Australian under-23 team for friendly matches against A-League sides. In June 2021, Rowles was called up to the team again for the Tokyo 2020 Olympics. He was part of the Olyroos Olympic squad. The team beat Argentine in their first group match but were unable to win another match. They were therefore not in medal contention.

Rowles made his Socceroos debut 1 June 2022 against Jordan in a friendly match, winning 2-1.

Rowles was called up to the 2022 FIFA World Cup in Qatar.

Honours 
Australia U20
 AFF U-19 Youth Championship: 2016

Individual
 Mariners Medal: 2020–21, 2021-22
 Mark Viduka Medal: 2021
A-Leagues All Star: 2022

References

External links

1998 births
Living people
Association football defenders
Australia youth international soccer players
Australian soccer players
Brisbane Roar FC players
Central Coast Mariners FC players
A-League Men players
National Premier Leagues players
Footballers at the 2020 Summer Olympics
Olympic soccer players of Australia
Scottish Professional Football League players
Heart of Midlothian F.C. players
People from the Illawarra
Sportsmen from New South Wales
Soccer players from New South Wales
Australian expatriate soccer players
Expatriate footballers in Scotland
Australian expatriate sportspeople in Scotland
2022 FIFA World Cup players